The 1995 German Grand Prix (formally the XXIV Grosser Mobil 1 Preis von Deutschland) was a Formula One motor race held at the Hockenheimring, Hockenheim on 30 July 1995. It was the ninth race of the 1995 Formula One World Championship.

The 45-lap race was won by local driver Michael Schumacher, driving a Benetton-Renault, after he started from second position. Brit David Coulthard finished second in a Williams-Renault, with Austrian Gerhard Berger third in a Ferrari. Brit Damon Hill took pole position in the other Williams-Renault, but spun off on lap 2 as a result of a driveshaft failure.

With the win, his fifth of the season, Schumacher extended his lead over Hill in the Drivers' Championship to 21 points.

Summary 
Damon Hill started the race from the pole position alongside Michael Schumacher.  After making a good start, Hill spun in the first corner on the 2nd lap sending his car across a gravel trap and into a tyre  barrier (caused by a broken driveshaft), ending his race.

Schumacher was left leading David Coulthard and Gerhard Berger, who was given a 10-second stop-and-go penalty for jumping the start of the race.  The penalty dropped Berger to 14th position though he fought back to finish back in 3rd place. Berger denied jumping the start, claiming that though his car did move slightly when he put it into gear, it was stationary when the green light came on to start the race.

Benetton's 2-stop strategy for Schumacher prevailed over the 1-stop strategy Coulthard was on, as Schumacher pulled away from the field giving himself enough room to make his second pit stop and remain in the lead. Schumacher became the first German to win a World Championship German Grand Prix. His car broke down after the race had finished, as did that of team-mate Johnny Herbert and Aguri Suzuki (whose car caught fire).

Initially it was believed that Hill spun off due to oil laid down on the track from overfull oil tanks – as it is common practice for teams to fill the oil tanks prior to the start of the race. A few days after the race, the Williams team discovered that Hill's car had in fact suffered from a driveshaft failure leading to his accident. Shortly before he went off, Murray Walker commented that he had noticed blue smoke coming out of the back of Hill's car; the reason for this was never discovered.

It was the final F1 race of Pierluigi Martini, who retired with a blown engine and was replaced by Pedro Lamy for the next race.

Classification

Qualifying

Race

Championship standings after the race

Drivers' Championship standings

Constructors' Championship standings

References

External links

German Grand Prix
Grand Prix
German Grand Prix
German Grand Prix